Ophiocordyceps camponoti-melanotici is a species of fungus that parasitizes insect hosts, in particular members of the order Hymenoptera. It was first isolated from Viçosa, Minas Gerais, on Camponotus melanoticus.

Description
This species' mycelium is a dark brown colour, and is quite sparse. Its stromatal morphology is similar to O. Camponoti-rufipedis. Its fertile area is also a dark brown colour, measuring up to 1.0mm. Its ascomata are semi-erumpent and flask-shaped, with a prominent neck. The ascospores are hyaline and thin-walled.

References

Further reading
Evans, Harry C., Simon L. Elliot, and David P. Hughes. "Ophiocordyceps unilateralis: A keystone species for unraveling ecosystem functioning and biodiversity of fungi in tropical forests?." Communicative & integrative biology4.5 (2011): 598–602.

External links

MycoBank

Ophiocordycipitaceae
Fungi described in 2011